Felipe Lourenço da Silva (born ) is a Brazilian male volleyball player. He was part of the Brazil men's national volleyball team at the 2014 FIVB Volleyball Men's World Championship in Poland. He played for São Bernardo Vôlei.

Sporting achievements

Clubs

South American Club Championship
  2016 – with Funvic Taubaté

National team
 2014  FIVB World League

Individual
 2016 South American Club Championship – Best Libero

References

1990 births
Living people
Brazilian men's volleyball players
Place of birth missing (living people)
Liberos
Sportspeople from São Paulo